The Takri block U+11680–U+116CF was added to the Unicode Standard in January 2012 with the release of version 6.1.

Chart

History
The addition was made possible in part by a grant from the United States National Endowment for the Humanities, which funded the Universal Scripts Project (part of the Script Encoding Initiative at the University of California, Berkeley).
The following Unicode-related documents record the purpose and process of defining specific characters in the Takri block:

Unicode blocks